Friend's Friend's Friend is the second album by the British art rock band Audience, released in 1970. It was originally intended to be produced by Shel Talmy; however, the band didn't warm to his approach and they opted to produce it themselves.

Track listing
Unless noted, all tracks credited to Howard Werth and Trevor Williams.

Side one
 "Nothing You Do" — 4:38
 "Belladonna Moonshine" — 2:40
 "It Brings a Tear" — 2:55
 "Raid" (Connor, Gemmell) — 8:44

Side two
 "Right On Their Side" — 5:24
 "Ebony Variations" (Connor, Gemmell, Werth, Williams) — 5:29
 "Priestess" (Connor, Gemmell) — 6:14
 "Friends, Friends, Friend" — 3:28

Bonus track on rerelease
 "The Big Spell" — 3:03

Personnel
Howard Werth — acoustic guitar, lead vocals, banjo
Trevor Williams — bass, backing vocals
Keith Gemmell — tenor saxophone, clarinet, flute
Tony Connor — drums, percussion, piano

Additional personnel
Mike Bobak — engineer
CCS — sleeve design

References

Charisma Records albums
1970 albums
Audience (band) albums
Elektra Records albums
Albums produced by Trevor Williams (musician)
Albums produced by Keith Gemmell
Albums recorded at Morgan Sound Studios